The Gaocheng South railway station is a railway station of Shiji Passenger Railway that is located in Gaocheng District, Shijiazhuang, Hebei, China.

Railway stations in Hebei
Stations on the Qingdao–Taiyuan High-Speed Railway